The boroselenates are chemical compounds containing interlinked borate and selenate groups sharing oxygen atoms. Both selenate and borate groups are tetrahedral in shape. They have similar structures to borosulfates and borophosphates. The borotellurates' tellurium atom is much bigger, so TeO6 octahedra appear instead.

List

References

Selenates
Borates